Clément Lefert (born 26 September 1987 in Nice) is a retired French Olympic champion in swimming. He won a gold medal at the London 2012 Summer Olympics in the 4 × 100 meters freestyle relay, with teammates Amaury Leveaux, Fabien Gilot, and Yannick Agnel, besting the American relay team that included Michael Phelps. He also won a silver medal in the 4 x 200 meters freestyle relay. Lefert is an economics major at the University of Southern California (USC), and holds USC's record in the 200 yard freestyle (1:33.67).

On 1 January 2013, Lefert was made a Knight (Chevalier) of the Legion of Honour.

After finishing his higher education studies, he started as a trader in a commodities trading company in London.

See also
USC Trojans
France at the Olympics

References

External links
 
 BBC Olympics athlete profile
 

1987 births
Chevaliers of the Légion d'honneur
French male butterfly swimmers
Living people
Medalists at the FINA World Swimming Championships (25 m)
Olympic gold medalists for France
Olympic silver medalists for France
Olympic swimmers of France
Sportspeople from Nice
Swimmers at the 2008 Summer Olympics
Swimmers at the 2012 Summer Olympics
USC Trojans men's swimmers
European Aquatics Championships medalists in swimming
Medalists at the 2012 Summer Olympics
Olympic gold medalists in swimming
Olympic silver medalists in swimming
Universiade medalists in swimming
Mediterranean Games silver medalists for France
Mediterranean Games medalists in swimming
Swimmers at the 2009 Mediterranean Games
Universiade silver medalists for France
Universiade bronze medalists for France
Medalists at the 2011 Summer Universiade
French male freestyle swimmers